Hamlet or the Last Game without MMORPG Features, Shaders and Product Placement (or Hamlet on Android and Hamlet! on iOS) is an indie adventure game based on William Shakespeare's Hamlet. It was developed and published by indie game developer Denis Galanin.

Plot 
A scientist travels back in time and gets mixed up with characters from William Shakespeare's play, Hamlet. Guide the man from the future as he embarks on a mission to save Hamlet's girlfriend, Ophelia, from the clutches of the evil Claudius. Solve a variety of point-and-click puzzles and advance from one scene to the next as you defeat bosses and overcome mental obstacles.

The game begins by setting up a version of Hamlet rather different from the original, in which Hamlet (a swashbuckling hero) returns to find Claudius and Polonius locking up Ophelia in attempts to marry Ophelia to Claudius. Just as Hamlet is about to run in to save her, a man from the future falls out of the sky in his time machine and lands on his head, incapacitating him. The man then goes to save Ophelia.

He first enters Polonius' house. Polonius turns out to be a shriveled, alien-like creature obsessed with chemistry and the periodic table of the elements. The time traveler kills Polonius, but in the process drops Ophelia into a well. When he dives down to rescue her, both are swallowed by a giant fish. With the help of an elderly man living in the fish's stomach, the two escape and surface in the moat outside of Claudius' castle. Claudius turns out to be a wannabe rock god. The player ruins his guitar solo (Claudius discards the guitar, which hits the old man from the fish and causes him to drown) and then causes a potion he is brewing to explode, draining most of his health. Before Claudius can be finished, however, he calls the guard, who lock Ophelia back up and put the time traveler on a ship to be thrown overboard while out to sea. The time traveler escapes confinement and, by manipulating a giant octopus who attacks the ship, defeats its captains, Rosencrantz and Guildenstern. He then pilots the ship back to land.

The time traveler sneaks back into Elsinore Castle. However, he encounters Laertes, a giant who Claudius sent to kill the traveler while he fled with Ophelia. The traveler manages to grab on to the tail of Claudius' fleeing horse. Arriving at Claudius' secret lair, the traveler opens numerous doors to get inside but a booby trap kills him . However, he is able to resurrect from the afterlife and enters the lair. Turning Claudius' death machine against him, the traveler rescues Ophelia, reunites her with a heavily bandaged Hamlet, and flies off in his time machine. The ending teases a sequel based on Romeo and Juliet.

Gameplay 
The player interacts with the world with simple point and click interface directing a small hero. The goal of Hamlet is to solve a series of puzzles and brain teasers. The puzzles are sequentially linked forming an adventure story. The game contains no inventory or dialogue, and the solving of puzzles mainly consists of clicking onscreen elements in the correct order. Solving a puzzle will immediately transport the player character to the next screen.

Development 
The Microsoft Windows version of Hamlet was developed over a period of eight months, by Denis Galanin, also known as mif2000.

Reception 

Hamlet has received mixed to positive reviews. Critics generally recommended the game to fans of point-and-click adventure games.
 
The game won the award for the Best iOS Game from The Mac Life Awards at Macworld Expo 2011.  Google Play Store included Hamlet on the list of Games We Love: Best Games of 2012. Split Sider included the game on the list of The 10 Funniest Video Games of 2010 and Jay is Games included Hamlet on the list of Best Downloadable Adventure Games of 2010.

See also
 The Franz Kafka Videogame

References

External links 
 
 

2010 video games
Adventure games
Alawar Entertainment games
Android (operating system) games
Big Fish Games games
IOS games
Point-and-click adventure games
Puzzle video games
Single-player video games
Video games about time travel
Video games based on works
Video games developed in Russia
Video games set in castles
Video games set in Denmark
Video games set in the Middle Ages
Windows games
Works based on Hamlet